Physics in Medicine & Biology is a biweekly peer-reviewed medical journal covering research on the application of physics to medicine, physiology, and biology. It was established in 1956 and is published by IOP Publishing on behalf of the Institute of Physics and Engineering in Medicine. It is also an official journal of the following medical societies: Canadian Organization of Medical Physics, Deutsche Gesellschaft für Medizinische Physik, Japanese Association of Radiological Physics, European Federation of Organisations for Medical Physics, and the International Organization for Medical Physics. The editor-in-chief is Katia Parodi (Ludwig Maximilian University of Munich).

Abstracting and indexing 
The journal is abstracted and indexed in:
Inspec
Chemical Abstracts
BIOSIS Previews/Biological Abstracts
Compendex
Embase/Excerpta Medica
PASCAL
Science Citation Index
Current Contents
Index Medicus/MEDLINE/PubMed
VINITI Database RAS

According to the Journal Citation Reports, the journal has a 2021 impact factor of 4.174.

References

External links

Medical physics journals
IOP Publishing academic journals
Publications established in 1956
English-language journals
Biweekly journals